Torsten Gustafsson  (22 February 1920 – 14 January 1994) was a Swedish politician. He was a member of the Centre Party. Gustafsson was the Swedish Minister for Defence 1981–1982. He was the brother of Einar Gustafsson.

References
This article was initially translated from the Swedish Wikipedia article.

1920 births
1994 deaths
Centre Party (Sweden) politicians
Swedish Ministers for Defence
20th-century Swedish politicians